Donte Jackson (born January 19, 1979) is an American college basketball coach, currently head coach for the Grambling State Tigers of the Southwestern Athletic Conference (SWAC).

Playing career
After a standout high school career in his hometown of Milwaukee, Wisconsin, Jackson attended Milwaukee for one season. Jackson transferred to Central State where he was an all-conference and all-region selection during the 2001-2002 season, and part of the Marauders' NAIA Division I National Tournament Sweet 16 squad from the 1999-2000 season.

Coaching career
After his playing career, Jackson became an assistant coach at his alma mater, and was in the position for seven years before being elevated to head coach in 2010. In his four years at Central State, Jackson compiled a 60-42 record, before accepting the head coaching position at Stillman. In two seasons as a member of the SIAC, Jackson led Stillman to a 44-16 record, winning the SIAC men's basketball tournament championship in 2016 and reaching the regional semifinals of the 2016 NCAA Division II men's basketball tournament. After 2016, the school dropped from NCAA Division II to NAIA. In its first year as a NAIA Independent, Jackson guided the team to a 22-5 record.

On June 28, 2017 Jackson was officially named the head coach at Grambling State.

In his first year with the Tigers, Jackson guided Grambling to its first SWAC regular season title since 1989. However, due to low APR scores, Grambling was ineligible for conference tournament and postseason play. For his efforts, Jackson was named 2018 SWAC Coach of the Year, and was the recipient of the 2018 Ben Jobe Award, as well.

Head coaching record

NCAA DII

Six wins vacated by NCAA
Two wins vacated by NCAA

NCAA DI

References

External links
Grambling State bio

1979 births
Living people
American men's basketball coaches
American men's basketball players
Basketball coaches from Wisconsin
Basketball players from Milwaukee
Central State Marauders basketball players
Grambling State Tigers men's basketball coaches
Milwaukee Panthers men's basketball players
Sportspeople from Milwaukee
Stillman Tigers men's basketball coaches